Rochdale A.F.C. were a football team from Rochdale, Lancashire, which existed for five years around the turn of the 20th century. The club have no connection with the present day Rochdale A.F.C. other than the name and ground, which thus makes the current club a spiritual successor.

History
In the late 19th century the predominant team sport in Rochdale was rugby, in contrast to nearby towns such as Bury and Bolton where association football was the dominant code. The town did not have an association football club until 1896, when the Rochdale Athletic Club and the Rochdale Athletic Ground Company formed Rochdale A.F.C. The club joined the Lancashire Combination for the 1896–97 season, finishing sixth. The following year they transferred to the Lancashire League, but met with less success, finishing twelfth out of fourteen teams in 1897–98. The club also entered the FA Cup for the first time, reaching the second qualifying round. During this season future Huddersfield Town and Arsenal manager Herbert Chapman played for the club, before moving on to Grimsby Town

In the next two seasons the club continued to dwell in the lower reaches of the Lancashire League, with ninth place in 1899–1900 their highest finish. At the end of this season the club left the Athletic Grounds to play at St. Clements, the ground now known as Spotland. The move coincided with financial hardship, and the team withdrew from the Lancashire League. The club entered the following season's FA Cup, winning two ties, but were unable to field a team for their third qualifying round tie against Workington. The club folded on 1 January 1901.

References

Defunct football clubs in England
Association football clubs established in 1896
Association football clubs disestablished in 1901
Football clubs in Rochdale
1896 establishments in England
1901 disestablishments in England
Defunct football clubs in Greater Manchester
Defunct football clubs in Lancashire